The northern puffback (Dryoscopus gambensis) is a species of bird in the family Malaconotidae.
It is found in northern sub-Saharan Africa. It forms a superspecies with the black-backed puffback, which replaces it in eastern equatorial and southern Africa.

Habitat
Its natural habitats are subtropical or tropical moist lowland forests, subtropical or tropical mangrove forests, and moist savanna.

Races
There are five accepted races:
 D. g. gambensis (M. H. C. Lichtenstein, 1823) – Senegambia to coastal Gabon
 D. g. congicus Sharpe, 1901 – lower catchment of Congo River
 D. g. malzacii (Heuglin, 1870) – eastern Cameroon to northwestern Tanzania
 D. g. erythreae Neumann, 1899 – Eritrea to South Sudan
 D. g. erwini Sassi, 1923 – Itombwe in eastern DRC

Gallery

References

northern puffback
Birds of Sub-Saharan Africa
northern puffback
Taxonomy articles created by Polbot